Herbert Lawrence Trube (September 3, 1886 – July 13, 1959) was an American athlete who competed in the 1908 Summer Olympics.

He competed for the United States in the 1908 Summer Olympics held in London, Great Britain in the 3 mile team where he won the silver medal with his teammates John Eisele and George Bonhag. He also participated in the five miles competition and was eliminated in the first round after being unable to finish his run.

Trube graduated from Cornell University in 1908, where he was also a member of the Quill and Dagger society.

References

External links
 profile

1886 births
1959 deaths
American male middle-distance runners
Athletes (track and field) at the 1908 Summer Olympics
Olympic silver medalists for the United States in track and field
Cornell University alumni
Medalists at the 1908 Summer Olympics